Fifth Third Field is the name or former name of a minor league baseball stadium in Ohio.

Fifth Third Field (Toledo, Ohio), a minor league baseball stadium in Toledo, Ohio
Day Air Ballpark, Dayton, Ohio known from 2000 to early 2020 as Fifth Third Field

See also
Fifth Third Ballpark, in Comstock Park, Michigan
Fifth Third Bank Ballpark, former name of Northwestern Medicine Field, in Geneva, Illinois